Elymnias nesaea, the tiger palmfly, is a butterfly in the family Nymphalidae.

Subspecies
Elymnias nesaea nesaea - W.Java 
Elymnias nesaea timandra Wallace, 1869 - Sikkim, Assam, northern Thailand, Laos, Yunnan 
Elymnias nesaea cortona Fruhstorfer, 1911 - Burma 
Elymnias nesaea apelles Fruhstorfer, 1902 - Thailand, lower Burma, southern Yunnan 
Elymnias nesaea lioneli Fruhstorfer, 1907 – Peninsular Malaya
Elymnias nesaea laisides de Nicéville, 1896 - Sumatra 
Elymnias nesaea neolais de Nicéville, 1898 - Nias 
Elymnias nesaea kamarina Fruhstorfer, 1906 - Batu Islands
Elymnias nesaea hypereides Fruhstorfer, 1903 - northern Borneo 
Elymnias nesaea coelifrons Fruhstorfer, 1907 - southern Borneo 
Elymnias nesaea hermia Fruhstorfer, 1907 - eastern Java 
Elymnias nesaea baweana Hagen, 1896 – Bawean
Elymnias nesaea vordemani Snellen, 1902 - Kangean Islands

Description
The upperside of the wings is black with long bluish-green streaks. Forewings show four or five spots on the apical area, while hindwings have subterminal whitish spots in the posterior interspaces. The underside has a broad dark brown area on both wings. In females, the undersides are white with brown or yellowish shading.

The adult mimics Danaus aglea.

The larva feeds on various Arecaceae species, mainly on Calamus species, Trachycarpus forturei Cyrtostachys lakka, Cocos nucifera and Ptychosperma macarthurii.

Distribution
This species can be found in India, Thailand, Laos, Burma, Peninsular Malaya, Java, Sumatra and Borneo.  Bhutan.

References

External links
 Discover life
 Yutaka
 Butterflies in Hala-hala

Butterflies described in 1764
Elymnias
Butterflies of Indochina
Taxa named by Carl Linnaeus